A fragrance is a chemical compound that has a smell or odor.

Fragrance may also refer to:

 Princess Fragrance, a character in the novel The Book and the Sword
 The Fragrance Foundation, a non-profit organization
 Perfume, a mixture used to give an agreeable scent

See also